Padgospan (also spelled Padghospan, Padhuspan and Baduspan) was a high-ranking office in the late Sasanian era, which functioned as the lieutenant of the spahbed (marshal).

References

Sources 
 

 

Sasanian military offices
Persian words and phrases